Kathrin Zimmermann (born 22 December 1966 in Gera) is a former backstroke swimmer from East Germany who won a silver medal in the 200 m backstroke at the 1988 Summer Olympics. Earlier, between 1983 and 1987 she won five silver and two bronze medals at European and world championships in the 100 m and 200 m backstroke events, as well as one world title in the 4 × 100 m medley relay.

Her mother Heidi Eisenschmidt competed in swimming at the 1960 Summer Olympics.

References

1966 births
Living people
Sportspeople from Gera
People from Bezirk Gera
Female backstroke swimmers
Olympic swimmers of East Germany
Swimmers at the 1988 Summer Olympics
Olympic silver medalists for East Germany
World Aquatics Championships medalists in swimming
European Aquatics Championships medalists in swimming
Medalists at the 1988 Summer Olympics
Olympic silver medalists in swimming